Sainte-Anne was a provincial electoral district in the Montreal region of Quebec, Canada.

It was created for the 1966 election from parts of Montréal–Sainte-Anne, Montréal–Saint-Henri and Montréal–Saint-Louis electoral districts.  Its final election was in 1989.  It disappeared in the 1994 election and its successor electoral district was Saint-Henri–Sainte-Anne.

It was named for the former ward of Sainte-Anne or St. Ann, encompassing Griffintown and the eastern part of Pointe-Saint-Charles, referring to the parish of St. Ann's Church in Griffintown.

Members of the Legislative Assembly / National Assembly

References
 Election results (National Assembly)
 Election results (QuebecPolitique.com)

Former provincial electoral districts of Quebec